Roy Eefting-Bloem (born 4 September 1989) is a Dutch road and track cyclist, who currently rides for UCI Continental team . He competed at the 2015 UCI Track Cycling World Championships.

He married Dutch runner Judith Bloem in the summer of 2021 and changed his full name to Roy Eefting-Bloem.

Major results

Road

2007
 3rd Omloop der Vlaamse Gewesten
2013
 5th Destination Thy
2014
 9th Ronde van Midden-Nederland
2017
 9th ZODC Zuidenveld Tour
2018
 Tour of Quanzhou Bay
1st  Points classification
1st Stage 3
 1st Stage 7 Tour of Poyang Lake
2019
 Tour of Qinghai Lake
1st Stages 11 & 12
 1st Stage 3 Tour of Xingtai
 2nd Overall Tour of China I
2021
 1st Omloop der Kempen
 9th PWZ Zuidenveld Tour
2022
 1st Stage 1a (TTT) Olympia's Tour
2023
 1st Stage 1 Tour de Taiwan

Track

2011
 2nd  Omnium, UEC European Under-23 Championships
2012
 3rd Scratch race, UCI World Cup, Glasgow
2013
 3rd  Team pursuit, UEC European Championships
2016
 1st  Omnium, National Championships
2017
 National Championships
1st  Scratch race
2nd Individual pursuit
3rd Omnium
2018
 National Championships
2nd Omnium
3rd Scratch race
2019
 UCI World Cup
1st Scratch race, Hong Kong
2nd Scratch race, Cambridge
 National Championships
1st  Points race
2nd Omnium
 2nd  Scratch race, UCI World Championships
2020
 3rd  Points race, UCI World Championships
2021
 UCI Champions League
1st Scratch race, London
3rd Elimination race, London
2022
 2nd Omnium, National Championships
 3rd  Scratch race, UCI World Championships
 3rd  Scratch race, UEC European Championships
2023
 2nd  Scratch race, UEC European Championships

References

External links

profile at dewielersite.net

1989 births
Dutch male cyclists
Dutch track cyclists
Living people
People from Harderwijk
Cyclists from Gelderland
European Games competitors for the Netherlands
Cyclists at the 2019 European Games
20th-century Dutch people
21st-century Dutch people